was a Japanese fashion magazine published by Gakken. The magazine targets girls from early- to mid-teens. The magazine was known for its models (called "Pichimo" as an abbreviation for "Pichi Lemon model"), as well as its abundance of fashion and beauty advice for early-to-mid teens . It ceased publication in October 2015.

Models

Active when publication ended

Past 
 Haruka Fukuhara
 Ai Moritaka
 Yūno Ōhara (Dream5)
 Nonoka Yamaguchi (E-girls)
 Nozomi Maeda
 Satsuki Nakayama
 Yuumi Shida
 Kento Yamazaki

See also
Nicola
Love Berry

References

External links
  

1986 establishments in Japan
2015 establishments in Japan
Defunct women's magazines published in Japan
Fashion magazines published in Japan
Magazines established in 1986
Magazines disestablished in 2015
Magazines published in Tokyo
Monthly magazines published in Japan
Teen magazines published in Japan
Women's fashion magazines